The 2008–09 Alaska Aces season is the 23rd season of the franchise in the Philippine Basketball Association (PBA).

Key dates
August 30: The 2008 PBA Draft took place in Fort Bonifacio, Taguig.
September 1: The free agency period started.

Draft picks

Roster

Depth chart

Philippine Cup

Standings

Game log

|- bgcolor="#bbffbb"
| 1
| October 5
| San Miguel
| 85–84
| Miller (17)
| 
| 
| Cuneta Astrodome
| 1–0
|- bgcolor="#bbffbb"
| 2
| October 11
| Coca Cola
| 69–62
| 
| 
| 
| Victorias, Negros Occidental
| 2–0
|- bgcolor="#bbffbb" 
| 3
| October 16
| Red Bull
| 89–83
| Miller (13)
| 
| 
| JCSGO Gym (Cubao)
| 3–0
|- bgcolor="#bbffbb" 
| 4
| October 19
| Rain or Shine
| 91–84
| Miller (21)
| 
| 
| Araneta Coliseum
| 4–0
|- bgcolor="#edbebf" 
| 5
| October 24
| Talk 'N Text
| 83–91
| Miller (29)
| 
| 
| Ynares Center
| 4–1
|- bgcolor="#edbebf" 
| 6
| October 29
| Air21
| 107–109
| Devance (25)
| 
| 
| Araneta Coliseum
| 4–2

|- bgcolor="#bbffbb" 
| 7
| November 2
| Brgy.Ginebra
| 93–84 OT
| Miller (25)
| Devance (20)
| Miller (6)
| Araneta Coliseum
| 5–2
|- bgcolor="#bbffbb" 
| 8
| November 7
| Sta.Lucia
| 95–89
| 
| 
| Tenorio (7)
| Cuneta Astrodome
| 6–2
|- bgcolor="#bbffbb" 
| 9
| November 9
| Purefoods
| 95–80
| Devance (20)
| 
| 
| Araneta Coliseum
| 7–2
|- bgcolor="#bbffbb" 
| 10
| November 15
| San Miguel
| 91–85
| Miller (20)
| 
| 
| 
| 8–2
|- bgcolor="#edbebf"
| 11
| November 19
| Rain or Shine
| 88–92
| Miller (29)
| 
| 
| Araneta Coliseum
| 8–3
|- bgcolor="#bbffbb" 
| 12
| November 22
| Talk 'N Text
| 113–86
| Devance (21)
| 
| 
| The Arena in San Juan
| 9–3
|- bgcolor="#edbebf" 
| 13
| November 28
| Sta.Lucia
| 80–92
| Miller (22)
| 
| 
| Ynares Center
| 9–4

|- bgcolor="#bbffbb" 
| 14
| December 5
| Coca Cola
| 99–83
| 
| 
| 
| Araneta Coliseum
| 10–4
|- bgcolor="#edbebf"
| 15
| December 10
| Red Bull
| 80–100
| Miller (13)
| 
| 
| Araneta Coliseum
| 10–5
|- bgcolor="#edbebf"
| 16
| December 13
| Brgy.Ginebra
| 82–84
| 
| 
| 
| Cagayan de Oro
| 10–6
|- bgcolor="#bbffbb" 
| 17
| December 19
| Air21
| 76–65
| Miller (23)
| 
| 
| Ynares Center
| 11–6
|- bgcolor="#bbffbb" 
| 18
| December 21
| Purefoods
| 76–74
| 
| 
| 
| Cuneta Astrodome
| 12–6

Awards and records

Awards

Records
Note: Alaska Aces Records Only

Transactions

Trades

Free Agents

Additions

Subtractions

References

Alaska Aces (PBA) seasons
Alaska Aces